Henrik Østervold (13 January 1878 – 21 August 1957) was a Norwegian sailor who competed in the 1920 Summer Olympics. He was a Helmsman of the Norwegian boat Atlanta, which won the gold medal in the 12 metre class (1907 rating).

References

External links 

1878 births
1957 deaths
Norwegian male sailors (sport)
Sailors at the 1920 Summer Olympics – 12 Metre
Olympic sailors of Norway
Olympic gold medalists for Norway
Olympic medalists in sailing
Medalists at the 1920 Summer Olympics